Ice Cold Beer is a mechanical arcade game released by Taito in 1983. The game is in a similar cabinet to an arcade video game, but where the screen would normally be there is a vertical wooden playfield dotted with holes. Two joysticks on the control panel control the height of the two ends of a metal bar that moves up and down the playfield, with a ball bearing rolling back and forth on the bar. The playfield is an amber color, and the holes in the playfield are suggestive of bubbles rising in a mug of beer.

The objective of the game is to use the two joysticks to tip the bar back and forth and maneuver the ball up to a specific lit hole on the playfield, while avoiding unlit holes. When the player deposits the ball in the lit hole, the ball and the bar return to the bottom of the playfield, and the next target hole is lit. The game begins with the bottom-most hole lit, and subsequent lit holes become more and more difficult to reach while avoiding unlit holes. There are also versions with a ticket dispenser.

Taito also released a "family friendly" version of the game in 1984 entitled Zeke's Peak, where the artwork of bubbles rising in a mug of beer was replaced by a mountain-climbing theme. The main character is Zeke, the protagonist from Taito's earlier arcade game Zoo Keeper.

In 2003, Innovative Concepts in Entertainment (ICE) released a remake of the game with new artwork and a ticket dispenser.

As of 2021, the world record is held by Matthew Ackerman with a score of 2,160,000 points.

Legacy
Rising-ICB for iOS (2015) is a video game clone of Ice Cold Beer, while TumbleSeed (2017) is based on the Ice Cold Beer mechanics.

56k Games has partnered with Taito to release Zeke's Peak on Steam in the Fall of 2019, including an authentic recreation of Ice Cold Beer and Zeke's Peak and featuring dozens of new levels and gameplay mechanics.

References

External links
Flyer for the original Ice Cold Beer
Flyer for Zeke's Peak
Flyer for the ICE remake of Ice Cold Beer
DIY Bartop Remake of the Game by Clem "mayermakes" Mayer on the element14presents Youtube channel

Arcade video games
1983 video games
Taito arcade games